Choreutis angulosa is a moth in the family Choreutidae. It was described by Alexey Diakonoff in 1968. It is found in the Philippines.

References

Natural History Museum Lepidoptera generic names catalog

Choreutis
Moths described in 1968